This is a list of the extreme points on land of Estonia: the points that are farther north, south, east or west than any other location.

Latitude and longitude
 North: Vaindloo island, Vainupea village, Haljala Parish, Lääne-Viru County
 Mainland: Cape Purekkari, Pärispea village, Kuusalu Parish, Harju County()
Urban settlement: Loksa Town, Harju County 
 East: Narva Town, Ida-Viru County
 South: Karisöödi village, Rõuge Parish, Võru County
Urban settlement: Misso small borough, Rõuge Parish, Võru County
 West: Nootamaa Island, Atla village, Lääne-Saare Parish, Saare County
Inhabited island: Vilsandi island, Vilsandi village, Saaremaa Parish, Saare County
Urban settlement: Kihelkonna small borough, Saaremaa Parish, Saare County
 Mainland: Cape Ramsi, Einbi/ village, Lääne-Nigula Parish, Lääne County
 Urban settlement: Haapsalu Town, Haapsalu Town (urban municipality), Lääne County

Altitude
 Highest point: Suur Munamägi, located in Haanja village, Haanja Parish, Võru County, 318 m
 Lowest point: Baltic Sea, 0 m

See also 

 Extreme points of Europe
 Extreme points of Earth
 Geography of Estonia

 
Lists of coordinates
Estonia
Extreme